Major General Thomas Gerald Dalby  (13 January 188014 March 1963) was a senior British Army officer who saw service in three conflicts.

Military career
After being educated at Eton College and the Royal Military College, Sandhurst, Dalby was commissioned into the King's Royal Rifle Corps on 5 April 1899. He saw service during the Second Boer War, where he was wounded, later campaigned in Somaliland in 1904.

His service in the First World War was recognised when he was appointed a companion of the Distinguished Service Order in the 1917 New Year Honours. Additionally, he was mentioned in dispatches four and was wounded twice, and married in 1917.

He became commanding officer of 2nd Battalion the King's Royal Rifle Corps in 1928 and commander of 3rd Infantry Brigade in 1931. He was appointed a Companion of the Order of the Bath in the 1936 Birthday Honours before retiring in 1937.

He was briefly recalled to become the first General Officer Commanding 18th Infantry Division, which was then based in the UK, in September 1939 before returning to retirement in November 1939.

References

Bibliography

External links
Generals of World War II

1880 births
1963 deaths
Companions of the Order of the Bath
Companions of the Distinguished Service Order
King's Royal Rifle Corps officers
British Army generals of World War II
British Army personnel of World War I
British Army major generals
People educated at Eton College
Graduates of the Royal Military College, Sandhurst
British Army personnel of the Second Boer War